Choi Geon-ju (born June 26, 1999) is a South Korean professional football forward currently playing for the Ansan Greeners of the K League 2.

Career statistics

Club

References

External links
 

1999 births
Living people
South Korean footballers
K League 2 players
Ansan Greeners FC players
Association football forwards